Binə (also, Bina Staraya and Biny Selo) is a settlement and municipality in Baku, Azerbaijan.  It has a population of 26,395. It is the nearest urban area to Baku Airport and was once home to one of the biggest markets in the country till that was moved to a location at the southernmost edge of Baku, near Lökbatan. The new market retains the name Binə Bazaar despite its lost geographical relevance.

References 

Populated places in Baku